Broom-Hilda is an American newspaper comic strip created by cartoonist Russell Myers. Distributed by Tribune Content Agency, it depicts the misadventures of a man-crazy, cigar-smoking, beer-guzzling, 1,500-year-old witch and her motley crew of friends.

The original idea for Broom-Hilda came from Elliot Caplin, brother of Li'l Abner cartoonist Al Capp. He described the main character to Myers, who responded with a sketch of the witch and several samples. Caplin, acting as Myers' business manager, submitted these to the Chicago Tribune Syndicate. Introduced on April 19, 1970, it became an immediate success. Broom-Hilda was reprinted in several collections during the 1970s and 1980s.

Characters and story
Although events mostly take place during the present in an unidentified forest, the setting changes. Locales change drastically from day to day—and background details can change from panel to panel within the same strip, while the characters remain stationary (much like the backgrounds in Krazy Kat). Broom-Hilda is capable of time travel, reappearing in various centuries throughout history to chat with (burlesque versions of) diverse historical figures.
 Broom-Hilda (a pun on Brünnhilde) is a witch with green skin, long, stringy hair, and a wart on the end of her nose. She wears a black dress, black shoes, striped stockings (one perpetually drooping) and a black hat with a daisy on top. According to the strip's official site, Broom-Hilda is Attila the Hun's ex-wife. She is perpetually looking for a new husband, but, due to her abrasive nature, the quest has thus far been unsuccessful. Early in the strip's run, she gave up cigar smoking and beer. She served in the United States Marine Corps for two days and was discharged for unnecessary roughness (glimpses of her underpants reveal a USMC label). A hint to her rough-hewn side occurs in one strip where she is buying underwear. The clerk suggests a set of underwear, each one bearing the days of the week. She asks if she can get a set with the months of the year.
 Irwin Troll has much hair, but little intelligence. Perpetually innocent and naïve to the point of imbecility, he is a simple-minded, sweet-natured, nature-loving character — very unlike Broom-Hilda.
 Gaylord Buzzard is a neurotic intellectual who wears thick, horn-rimmed glasses, spats and (sometimes) a fez for reading. Worldly, egotistical and sarcastic, he enjoys playing practical jokes on the other characters, particularly Broom-Hilda. Gaylord is a vegetarian. He bears the scar of a youth spent in movie theaters: He's hopelessly addicted to popcorn.
 Nerwin Troll is Irwin's smart-aleck nephew, attaining the name from a newspaper contest as a blend of "nerd" and "Irwin". Irwin broke the fourth wall to address readers. Nerwin is often drawn wearing a propeller beanie, giving him the look of a stereotypical comic strip representation of a bratty juvenile delinquent, and he has also been known to frequently behave as such.
 Grelber is never seen except for his eyes and perpetually grinning teeth, always peering out from a hollow log perched on the edge of a cliff. Mysterious and openly malevolent, he dispenses "Free insults", as a sign at the entrance of his log proclaims.
 Wolfie is Broom-Hilda's small, timid pet wolf. Though an animal who never speaks, he is capable of intelligent thought, à la Snoopy.
 Big Lump, a large dinosaur-like creature, appeared in the strip's early years.

Animation
Broom-Hilda was adapted twice for animated television series. The first was part of Archie's TV Funnies (1971), an animated series set in a television station run by Archie Andrews and his friends. Broom-Hilda was one of the comic strips featured on their show, along with Dick Tracy, Moon Mullins, Emmy Lou, The Captain and the Kids, The Dropouts, Nancy and Smokey Stover. The series was produced by Filmation Associates. Broom-Hilda's voice was provided by Jane Webb (also the voice of Betty Cooper and Veronica Lodge).

Broom-Hilda returned in another Filmation series, Fabulous Funnies (1978). Thirteen episodes were produced, and the series ran for one season on NBC. The show featured animated versions of several famous comic strips, including Tumbleweeds, Alley Oop and Nancy. Voices were provided by June Foray (Broom-Hilda), Bob Holt (Gaylord) and Alan Oppenheimer (Irwin and Grelber).

The character also made a brief animated appearance in The Fantastic Funnies (1980), a TV special that aired on CBS showcasing newspaper cartoonists. The animation sequence was produced by Bill Melendez Productions. June Foray was brought back to voice the character.

Other media
A live-action Broom-Hilda sketch was included in the special Mother's Day Sunday Funnies broadcast May 8, 1983, on NBC.

In 2004, it was announced that there would be a Broadway musical based on the comic strip characters, written by Martin Charnin (Annie) and Kurt Andersen (Spy magazine). The music was composed by Leroy Anderson. There was discussion of casting with Andersen suggesting Catherine Zeta-Jones for the title role, but the show was not produced.

Grelber also appeared as a computer program on old Unix systems. Typing the command "Grelber" would cause the computer to insult the user.

Awards
Myers won the National Cartoonists Society's Humor Comic Strip Award for 1975 for his work on the strip.

Caplin died in 2000. Myers continues to write and draw the strip, compiling a large backlog of strips in the event poor health were to prevent him from meeting his syndication requirements.

Russell Myers collections
Broom-Hilda (1971) Lancer Books
I Love You, Broom-Hilda (1973) Tempo Books
Broom-Hilda Rides Again! (1975) Tempo
Ugly Is as Ugly Does: The Broom-Hilda Story (1976) Tempo
Flying Low with Broom-Hilda (1976) Tempo
Broom-Hilda Presents: Mother Nature's Personal Friend, Irwin Troll (1976) Tempo
Losing Control with Broom-Hilda (1976) Tempo
Popcorn Sandwiches! A Broom-Hilda Book (1977) Tempo
Broom-Hilda: Baying at the Moon and Other Tales of Unrequited Love (1977) Tempo
Boo! Broom-Hilda (1977) Tempo
X-Rated X-Rays: A Broom-Hilda Book (1978) Tempo
Broom-Hilda: Growing Old Gracelessly and Other Indignities (1978) Tempo
Broom-Hilda: Never Stilt-Walk in Gopher Country (1978) Ace Books
Broom-Hilda: Life Begins at 1500 (1981) Fawcett
Open at You Own Risk!! A Broom-Hilda Book (1981) Fawcett
Broom-Hilda: (Comic) Strip Tease (1982) Fawcett
Broom-Hilda: Sneaky Volcanos (1982) Fawcett
Broom-Hilda: Doing What I Do Best (1984) Fawcett
Broom-Hilda: Never Trust Short Green People! (1984) Fawcett
Broom-Hilda: I Always Get My Mountie! (1985) Fawcett
Broom-Hilda: Lookin' Good! (1985) Fawcett
Broom-Hilda: Space Junk (1986) Fawcett
Broom-Hilda: One Rotten Apple (1986) Fawcett
Broom-Hilda: Sore Loser (1987) Fawcett
Broom-Hilda: The Backward Heimlich (1987) Fawcett

Theme park
At Universal's Islands of Adventure, in Toon Lagoon, Broom-Hilda can be seen in front of the entrance of Comic Strip Cafe.

Notes

External links
Official site
Broom-Hilda at Don Markstein's Toonopedia. Archived from the original on February 22, 2018.
Voices of Oklahoma interview. First person interview conducted on April 20, 2020 with Russell Myers.

1970 comics debuts
American comics characters
Comics about magic
Comics about women
Comics adapted into animated series
Comics adapted into television series
Comics characters who use magic
Comic strips syndicated by Tribune Content Agency
Female characters in comics
Fictional witches
Gag-a-day comics